Henri Maïdou (born 14 February 1936) is a retired Central African politician who served as Prime Minister of the Central African Empire (Central African Republic) from 14 July 1978 to 26 September 1979, and Vice President of the CAR in the cabinet of David Dacko from September 1979 to August 1980.

Biography

Early life
Maïdou was born on 14 February 1936 in Bangui. His father, Maurice Maïdou, was an official and his twin brother, Christophe Maïdou, who served as the Central African Ambassador to the Democratic Republic of Congo, Yugoslavia, Japan, Taiwan, France, and the United States. Henri Maïdou came from an academic background and worked as a geography professor.

Political career
His entry into politics came on 25 June 1970, when President Jean-Bédel Bokassa named him Minister of Education. He became Minister of Youth, Sports, and Arts (along with Education) on 26 April 1971. Maïdou was appointed Minister of Public Health and Social Affairs on 16 October 1973. On 15 June 1974, he became Minister of Urbanism and Territorial Administration. His second stint as Minister of Education, Youth, Sports, Arts, and Culture began on 4 April 1976. Maïdou became Second Vice Prime Minister of the Central African Revolution Council on 4 September, with his portfolio consisting of national education and education reform. The council was disbanded on 14 December. Soon afterward, Bokassa transformed the country into the Central African Empire, with himself as Emperor Bokassa I.

Bokassa was unsatisfied with the results of the 1977 baccalaureate and sought to reform the school system. Maïdou's solution was to remove French teachers, an option Bokassa rejected. At the bidding of Bokassa, Maïdou announced on 2 February 1978 that all schoolchildren must wear a specific type of uniform by 1 October. Jewelry and hats were forbidden, and students faced suspension from school if they refused to comply. The uniforms were costly, and were manufactured by a company owned by Bokassa's family, the Compagnie industrielle ouanguienne des textiles. This sparked student protests, and their suppression resulted in the "Bangui children's massacre". Around 100 children perished in the massacre.

Prime Minister Ange-Félix Patassé suffered a heart attack in March 1978 and went to France to recuperate. In his absence, Bokassa dissolved his government and appointed Maïdou prime minister on 14 July 1978. Maïdou broke with Bokassa in May 1979, after having to read a statement that denied that the children's massacre ever happened. He feared the wrath of the citizens if Bokassa's regime fell. He was likely involved in the plot that overthrew Bokassa on 20 September 1979.

On 26 September, President David Dacko appointed him vice president. While vice president, Maïdou gave an interview with Jeune Afrique, stating that he and Dacko were not faithful members of the regime but followed along out of terror. "Some terror," Bokassa responded from exile, "with loads of CFA francs, beautiful cars, beautiful villas, beautiful women, and beautiful business. Look at him [Maïdou] in the photograph, with the face of a bon vivant and playboy." Maïdou was removed from this position on 22 August 1980 and subsequently placed under house arrest, as many opposition groups opposed his appointment. Maïdou founded the Parti republicain pour le progres on 27 December and contested the March 1981 presidential election. He finished fourth with 3.2 percent of the vote and subsequently left politics.

Later career
Maïdou testified at Bokassa's trial in December 1986, stating he wanted to stage a coup even earlier but was unable due to the extensive espionage network. On 1 March 1988, Maïdou became president of the Union bancaire en Afrique centrale (UBAC). President Patassé named him deputy coordinator of the Dialogue national in November 2002. The Dialogue national was a national reconciliation conference, convened to reduce tensions in the country. He became an adviser to General Francois Bozize in July 2003, several months after Bozize seized power. In September, he resigned as head of the Dialogue national. Maïdou was the president of the first summit of the media conference Etats generaux des media centrafricains, held between 27 August and 1 September 2007. Between December 2008 and February 2009, he was second deputy chairman of the Dialogue political inclusif, at which point he became chairman of its monitoring committee.

Awards
Central African Orders of Academic Palms (1972)
Sports Merit Gold Medal (1972)
Postal Merit Officer (1972)
Operation Bokassa Officer (1974)

Notes

References

1936 births
Living people
People from Bangui
Prime Ministers of the Central African Republic
Vice presidents of the Central African Republic